The Maltese Third Division 2007–08 (known as BOV 3rd Division due to sponsorship reasons) was the 8th season and started on 21 September 2007 and finished on 18 May.For the first time the Division was divided into two sections:A and B.Section A consisted of 10 teams and Section B of 9.The winners of Section A were Zebbug Rangers and those of Section B were Gozo FC.Both were promoted to the 2nd Division.The overall champions were Gozo FC who beat Zebbug 3-1.The match was abandoned on 57 minutes. The teams who finished 2nd and 3rd in each Section were to play in a promotion/relegation playoff with the 10th finishing place team of Second Division.These were Attard, Xghajra from Section A and Gzira and Gharghur from Section B.The 10th finishing team from Second Division were Mgarr.Mgarr won the play-off Final and therefore each team stayed in its respective Division.

Participating teams

Section A

 Attard
 Fgura
 Ghaxaq
 Mdina
 Mtarfa
 Qrendi
 Siggiewi
 Xghajra
 Zebbug
 Zejtun

Section B

 Gharghur
 Gozo FC
 Gudja
 Gzira
 Kalkara
 Kirkop
 Luqa
 Pembroke
 Santa Lucia

Changes from previous season
 Mgarr United, Sirens and Zurrieq were promoted to the Second Division. They were replaced with Gozo FC, Gudja United and Zebbug Rangers, all relegated from 2006–07 Maltese Second Division.

Standings

Section A

Section B

Champions playoff
Champions Play off

|}
 Match abandoned on 57 minutes. Zebbug Rangers started a fight and the referee had to abandon the match. Gozo FC were winning 3-1 and that was taken as the final score. As a punishment, Zebbug started the 2008–09 Maltese Second Division with a five point deduction.

Promotion-relegation playoffs
Quarter final

|}
Gharghur remain in Maltese Third Division

Semi finals

|}
 Xghajra Tornadoes and Gzira United remain in Maltese Third Division

Final

|}
 Mgarr United remain in Maltese Second Division
 Attard remain in Maltese Third Division

Results

Section A

Section B

Top scorers

Maltese Third Division seasons
4
Malta